Gina Wilkinson (March 10, 1960 – December 30, 2010) was a Canadian actress of stage, film and television, as well as a playwright and stage director.

Early life and education 
Wilkinson was born on March 10, 1960, in Victoria, Canada. Her father, Jack Wilkinson, was a visual artist and her mother, Marie Wilkinson, was a ballet dancer.

She attended the National Theatre School of Canada.

Career 
Wilkinson spent the majority of her early career as an actor; however, she later expanded to directing. In 2007, Wilkinson directed Born Yesterday at the Shaw Festival. In 2010, she directed Faith Healer for Soulpepper. She also directed Half an Hour for the Shaw Festival. In 2010, Wilkinson directed the world premiere of Brendan Gull's Wide Awake Hearts at Tarragon Theatre.

Personal life 
Wilkinson was diagnosed with stage 4 cervical cancer on November 21, 2010. Wilkinson married her longtime partner, actor Tom Rooney, while in hospital receiving treatment, on December 19, 2010. She died on December 30, 2010, aged 50.

Legacy 
Shortly after her death, the Gina Wilkinson Prize was established in Wilkinson's honour. The award offers financial support to a Canadian female theatre artist/leader.

Plays 

 My Mother's Feet
 Whistle Me Home

Filmography

Film

Filmography

References

External links
 

1960 births
2010 deaths
Deaths from cervical cancer
Deaths from cancer in Ontario
Canadian stage actresses
Canadian theatre directors
Canadian film actresses
Canadian television actresses
Canadian women dramatists and playwrights
National Theatre School of Canada alumni
Actresses from Victoria, British Columbia
Writers from Victoria, British Columbia
20th-century Canadian dramatists and playwrights
20th-century Canadian women writers